The elongate dory (Zenion leptolepis) is a dory in the genus Zenion found around South Africa, Mozambique, Kenya and New Zealand at depths of between .

References
 
Tony Ayling & Geoffrey Cox, Collins Guide to the Sea Fishes of New Zealand, (William Collins Publishers Ltd, Auckland, New Zealand 1982) 

Zeniontidae
Fish described in 1924